Aurora Glacier may refer to:
Aurora Glacier (Alaska)
Aurora Glacier (Antarctica)